Dmitry Nikolaevich Sokolov (alternate spelling: Dmitri Sokolov) (born January 21, 1985) is a Russian professional basketball player for Khimki of the VTB United League. He plays at the center position.

Professional career
Sokolov has played with Dynamo Stavropol, Pulkovo St. Petersburg, Lokomotiv Rostov, UNICS Kazan, and CSKA Moscow during his professional career. He joined CSKA in June 2009. He returned to UNICS Kazan in 2013. In June 2015, he left UNICS.

On July 31, 2015, he signed a one-year deal with Krasny Oktyabr. On December 16, 2015, he left them and signed with Khimki for the rest of the season. On June 23, 2016, he re-signed with Khimki for one more season. He returned to Khimki in March, 2019.

National team
Sokolov played for the Russian national basketball team at the EuroBasket 2009 and EuroBasket 2013.

References

External links
 Dmitry Sokolov at euroleague.net
 Dmitry Sokolov at eurobasket.com
 Dmitry Sokolov at fiba.com

1985 births
Living people
BC Khimki players
BC Krasny Oktyabr players
BC UNICS players
Centers (basketball)
PBC CSKA Moscow players
PBC Lokomotiv-Kuban players
Russian men's basketball players
People from Alexandrovsky District, Stavropol Krai
Sportspeople from Stavropol Krai